Filip Stanisław Adwent (31 August 1955 in Strasbourg – 26 June 2005) was a Polish politician and a Member of the European Parliament for the Pomeranian Voivodship.

He ran as a candidate from the League of Polish Families , and sat on the European Parliament's Committee on Agriculture and Rural Development.

Adwent was a substitute for the Committee on Transport and Tourism and a vice-chair of the Delegation to the EU-Ukraine Parliamentary Cooperation Committee.

He died eight days after he and his family were involved in a multiple car accident which occurred on 18 June 2005 near Warsaw. His father and daughter died instantly, along with two other people. Adwent, aged 49, and his mother died eight (8) days later from their injuries.

Education
 2004: Physician specialising in anaesthesiology and intensive therapy (1983), post-graduate studies at the Warsaw Agricultural University in Environmental Protection

Career
 2001-2002: Member of the Polish Alliance
 Organiser of aid to Polish hospitals for 15 years, honoured by the Minister of Health and Social Welfare for services to the protection of health

See: 2004 European Parliament election in Poland

External links
 
 
 

1955 births
2005 deaths
Politicians from Strasbourg
Polish anesthesiologists
League of Polish Families politicians
Road incident deaths in Poland
Place of birth missing
Polish Roman Catholics
League of Polish Families MEPs
MEPs for Poland 2004–2009